Arthur Kluckers (born 15 March 2000) is a Luxembourgish professional cyclist, who currently rides for UCI ProTeam .

Major results 

2017
 1st  Time trial, National Junior Road Championships
2018
 National Junior Road Championships
1st  Time trial
2nd Road race
 2nd  Combined team (with Nicolas Kess), Summer Youth Olympics
 2nd Grand Prix François Faber
 7th Overall Grand Prix Rüebliland
2019
 1st Stage 3 
 National Under-23 Road Championships
3rd Road race
4th Time trial
2020
 3rd Time trial, National Under-23 Road Championships
2021
 National Under-23 Road Championships
1st  Road race
1st  Time trial
 4th Overall Course de la Paix U23 – Grand Prix Jeseníky
2022
 National Under-23 Road Championships
1st  Time trial
2nd Road race
 1st Stage 5 Flèche du Sud
 5th Overall Tour Alsace
1st Stage 4
 5th Overall Le Triptyque des Monts et Châteaux
 6th Flèche Ardennaise
 9th Time trial, UEC European Under-23 Road Championships

References

External links

2000 births
Living people
Luxembourgian male cyclists
Cyclists at the 2018 Summer Youth Olympics